Albionbaatar is an extinct mammal from the Lower Cretaceous Lulworth Formation of England. It was a member of the also extinct order Multituberculata and shared the world with the much larger dinosaurs. It is in the suborder "Plagiaulacida", family Albionbaataridae. The genus Albionbaatar was named by Kielan-Jaworowska Z. and Ensom P.C. in 1994 based on a single species.

"Albion" refers to England, while, "baatar" is Mongolian, meaning "hero". This is due to a recent nomenclatural tradition among specialists who study this group. Many multituberculates are called "something"-baatar, regardless of where they come from. This is in part because the best preserved remains of multis tend to come from the Upper Cretaceous of the Gobi desert.

The primary species, Albionbaatar denisae, also named by Kielan-Jaworowska and Ensom, was found in Berriasian (Lower Cretaceous) strata of Durlston Bay, in Dorset. It is a miniature multituberculate from the Isle of Purbeck.

References
 Kielan-Jaworowska & Ensom (1994), "Tiny plagiaulacoid multituberculate mammals from the Purbeck Limestone Formation of Dorset, England". Paleontology 37, p. 17-31.
 Kielan-Jaworowska Z & Hurum JH (2001), "Phylogeny and Systematics of multituberculate mammals". Paleontology 44, p. 389-429.
 Much of this information has been derived from  MESOZOIC MAMMALS; Plagiaulacidae, Albionbaataridae, Eobaataridae & Arginbaataridae, an Internet directory.

Cretaceous mammals of Europe
Multituberculates
Prehistoric mammals of Europe
Prehistoric mammal genera